Trostrey is a small hamlet and parish in Monmouthshire, in southeast Wales located about  north/northwest of Usk.

History
Excavations at the castle in 2000 found evidence of burial cairns from the Neolithic and Bronze Age periods. An 11th-century earthen motte-and-bailey castle was replaced in the 13th century by a small stone fort. The Church of St David is dedicated to St David.

Notes

References
 

Villages in Monmouthshire